Joseph Hahn (born March 15, 1977) is an American musician, DJ, director and visual artist best known as the DJ of the American rock band Linkin Park, doing the scratching, turntables, sampling, and programming for all seven of Linkin Park's albums. Hahn, along with bandmate Mike Shinoda, is responsible for most of Linkin Park's album artwork. Hahn also directed many of the band's music videos.

Early life and education 

Joseph "Joe" Hahn was born the youngest of three children in Dallas; Hahn has two older sisters. Hahn grew up in Glendale, California, and is a second-generation Korean American.

Hahn graduated from Herbert Hoover High School in Glendale in 1995. He then studied at the Art Center College of Design in Pasadena but did not graduate.

Career 

Hahn began deejaying in high school, and he studied illustration at the Art Center College of Design in Pasadena, California. In college, he met Mike Shinoda and joined his band Xero, which would release its self-titled demo album in 1997. The band later became known as Hybrid Theory in 1999 with the EP release of the same name as the band, then was changed again into Linkin Park during the recording sessions of Hybrid Theory. Hahn and Shinoda guested in the X-Ecutioners' hit single "It's Goin' Down". Hahn also guest starred in Shinoda's Fort Minor's debut album The Rising Tied on the song "Slip Out the Back".

Hahn was called Chairman Hahn on the back cover of Linkin Park's first remix album Reanimation next to the remixes of the songs "With You" and "Cure for the Itch", titled "Wth>You" and "Kyur4 TH Ich", respectively. Hahn has directed several of Linkin Park's music videos, such as those for "Numb", "From the Inside", "What I've Done", "Somewhere I Belong", "Pts.OF.Athrty", "New Divide", "Bleed It Out" and "Iridescent". He has also directed videos for Alkaline Trio, Static-X, Story of the Year, and Xzibit. In a 2003 interview, he told MTV that film-making was his true passion, and that "doing the music [was] more of an extra thing". He is known to add various dramatic effects to the music videos he directs, such as casting a snake in the video for "Iridescent".

Outside of his work in music, Hahn provided special effects work on The X-Files and the miniseries Frank Herbert's Dune. He also directed a short film called The Seed and acquired the rights to produce a film adaptation of China Miéville's novel King Rat.

Hahn directed the trailer for the video game Medal of Honor, featuring Linkin Park's single "The Catalyst". Hahn also directed the music video for "The Catalyst", which premiered on August 26, 2010, as well as the music video for Linkin Park's "Waiting for the End" and "Burning in the Skies". On April 13, 2011, Mike Shinoda confirmed on his blog that the music video for "Iridescent" would be directed by Hahn.

Hahn became the first Korean American to receive a Grammy when the band won the 2002 award for Best Hard Rock Performance. In November 2011, Hahn designed a helmet of Formula 1 driver Kamui Kobayashi. As of April 2012, Hahn directed a film adaptation of Eric Bogosian's Mall, based on the novel, which stars and is executive produced by Vincent D'Onofrio. The musical score for the album was handled by Linkin Park and Alec Puro of Deadsy for the film.

In 2019, he was a judge in the South Korean JTBC talent show Superband.

In 2022, Hahn composed the original score for the Samurai movie Blade of the 47 Ronin along with co-contributor Alec Puro.

Personal life
On February 15, 2005, Hahn married Karen Benedit; they divorced in 2009. On October 21, 2012, Hahn married Heidi Woan, whom he had met about two years prior in 2010. Their daughter was born the next year.

Discography

With Linkin Park

 Hybrid Theory (2000)
 Meteora (2003)
 Minutes to Midnight (2007)
 A Thousand Suns (2010)
 Living Things (2012)
 The Hunting Party (2014)
 One More Light (2017)

Other appearances

Filmography

Music videos

Films

References

External links

 "Billboard" – Google Books

20th-century American musicians
21st-century American musicians
Alternative metal musicians
American hip hop DJs
American heavy metal musicians
American music video directors
American musicians of Korean descent
Grammy Award winners
Linkin Park members
Living people
Musicians from Glendale, California
Musicians from Los Angeles County, California
People from Glendale, California
Rock DJs
Special effects people
1977 births